Bilal Abdulrahman (born November 14, 1983) is a Qatari footballer. He currently plays as a midfielder  . He previously played for the Qatar national football team.

In 2003, he had a trial with Paris Saint-Germain F.C. and impressed the coach Luis Fernández. However, he was to be loaned to Belgian team Mons for 6 months before he could play for the French side. He did not make any league appearances for the club and returned to Al Sadd.

References

External links 
 

1983 births
Living people
Qatari footballers
Qatar international footballers
Qatari expatriate footballers
Expatriate footballers in Belgium
Qatari expatriate sportspeople in Belgium
Al Sadd SC players
R.A.E.C. Mons players
Al-Shamal SC players
Al-Gharafa SC players
Qatar Stars League players
Qatari Second Division players
Al Ahli SC (Doha) players
Al-Shahania SC players
Footballers at the 2002 Asian Games
Association football midfielders
Asian Games competitors for Qatar